Thomas Frank Brown (1906 – after 1928) was an English professional footballer who played as a full back in the Football League for Fulham and in non-League football for Percy Main Amateurs, Crook Town and York City.

References

1906 births
Footballers from Sunderland
Year of death missing
English footballers
Association football midfielders
Percy Main Amateurs F.C. players
Crook Town A.F.C. players
Newcastle United F.C. players
Fulham F.C. players
Charlton Athletic F.C. players
York City F.C. players
English Football League players
Midland Football League players